K. S. Jayalakshmi is an Indian actress who works in the Tamil film and television industries. She has acted in comedy roles in movies. Jayalakshmi made her acting debut in the Tamil film Etharkum Thuninthavan released in 1976.

Career 
She has since then been featured in more than a hundred films, including Agni Satchi, Poikkal Kudhirai, Manathil Uruthi Vendum, Guru Sishyan, Pudhu Pudhu Arthangal and Kaadhale Nimmadhi.

She was regularly cast in productions by Kavithalaya Productions and has acted in numerous films by K. Balachander.

Television 

Serials

Reality shows 
 Vaanam Vasapadum
 Super Kudumbam Season 1
 Sooriya Vanakkam
 Sollathan Nanikeren
 Sagara Sangama
 Puthiya Paatukal
 Poi Solla Porom

Films

References

External links 
 

Tamil actresses
Indian film actresses
Indian television actresses
Actresses in Tamil cinema
Actresses in Tamil television
Tamil television actresses
Year of birth missing (living people)
Living people